Cosmopterix phyladelphella is a moth of the family Cosmopterigidae. It is known from Russia.

References

phyladelphella